Cargo-D was a spot hire railway carriage company in England. It commenced operations in June 2007, ceasing in October 2011.

History
In June 2007, Cargo-D entered the railway carriage market with a rake of British Rail Mark 2 and Mark 3 carriages that were prepared for service at Long Marston. They were painted in British Rail blue and grey livery.

In January 2008 it commenced a contract to hire Mark 3s to First Hull Trains for weekend London King's Cross to Doncaster services. In April 2008, Cargo-D commenced providing Mark 3s to Wrexham & Shropshire while its own Mark 3s were overhauled for service. In December 2008, it commenced a contract to provide four Mark 2s to First Great Western for a Cardiff to Taunton service.

In 2009, it commenced a contract to provide a Mark 3 set to Virgin Trains West Coast for a Fridays only service from London Euston to Preston.

In October 2011, Cargo-D was placed in administration and the carriages sold. At this stage, Cargo-D owned 35 Mark 2s and 18 Mark 3s.

References

Post-privatisation British railway companies
Railway companies established in 2007
Railway companies disestablished in 2011
2007 establishments in England
2011 disestablishments in England